Krepovsky is a rural locality (a khutor) in Krepovskoye Rural Settlement, Uryupinsky District, Volgograd Oblast, Russia. The population was 356 as of 2010. There are 6 streets.

Geography 
Krepovsky is located in steppe, 8 km northeast of Uryupinsk (the district's administrative centre) by road. Uchkhoz is the nearest rural locality.

References 

Rural localities in Uryupinsky District